The 1977 San Jose Earthquakes season was the club's fourth season of existence as a franchise in the North American Soccer League, then the top-tier of American soccer. The Earthquakes finished in third place in the Southern Division of the Pacific Conference, strong enough to qualify for the playoffs.

Background

Review

Squad
The 1977 squad

Competitions

NASL

Results summary

Results by round

Match results

Season 

* = ShootoutSource:

NASL Playoffs

Standings

Pacific Conference

Statistics

Transfers

Awards and recognition

References

External links
The Year in American Soccer – 1977 | NASL
San Jose Earthquakes All-time Game Results | Soccerstats.us

San Jose Earthquakes seasons
San Jose Earthquakes
San Jose Earthquakes
1977 in sports in California